John McClure (died 1915), nicknamed Poker Jack, was a politician and judge in Arkansas during Reconstruction. He was originally a lawyer from Ohio.

McClure was part of Powell Clayton's inner circle. A Republican carpetbagger, he arrived in the capital city of Little Rock as the Lieutenant Colonel of an African-American regiment in the United States Army. Dismissed from the Army for playing cards, he gained the nickname, "Poker Jack," from the Democrats. After the American Civil War ended, he became an agent of the Freedmens Bureau for Arkansas County in eastern Arkansas.

In 1868, he was appointed to the Arkansas Supreme Court and served until 1871.  When Clayton was impeached in 1870, McClure issued an injunction preventing Clayton's lieutenant governor James M. Johnson from taking office.  As a result of this action, McClure was also impeached and only narrowly avoided removal from office.

Notes

1915 deaths
Arkansas Republicans
Justices of the Arkansas Supreme Court
Year of birth missing
People from Arkansas County, Arkansas
Politicians from Little Rock, Arkansas
Lawyers from Little Rock, Arkansas
Chief Justices of the Arkansas Supreme Court